The Sultan Bateri watch tower, constructed in 1784 by Tipu Sultan is in Boloor, 4 km from the centre of Mangalore city, the chief port city in the state of Karnataka, India.

History
Boloor is known for the watch tower constructed in the era of the emperor Tipu Sultan such that now the area surrounding the decaying structure is its namesake. The watch tower was constructed 15 years before his death in 1784 A.D. The place was previously known as Sultan's Battery (see artillery battery). 

Sultan Battery was built of black stones and constructed to obstruct war ships from entering the river which was the major route for English invasion but was then retrieved from English by Tipu Sultan. It was also used as a fort with mounting places for cannons to avoid Britishers to enter Mangalore by sea.

There is an underground storage area under the tower that was used to store gunpowder. As per historians, this underground has secret route which leads to Mysore. Unfortunately, now it is closed and locked by Indian Tourism Authorities. 

It was the major dockyard and arsenal of the ruler. It was a naval station and was of great importance to the sultan as he used it to intercept enemy warships and prevent them from docking.
If one climbs to the top of the watch tower by stairs, there is a panoramic view of Arabian Sea shows a blend of natural and man-made beauty. It is now nearly deserted with a few shacks and a boating club nearby, but it is gathering popularity among tourists.

Geography 

The coastal area of Boloor and the southern adjoining area of Bokkapatna are more apt to be termed Mangalorean villages, than Mangalorean suburbs, given the general traditional lifestyle most residents of the areas still fish and trade as the primary activities. The streets of Bokkapatna at sunset give the quaint feeling of a dear old village. Boloor overlooks the Gurpura river which snakes further south and joins the Arabian sea by interrupting the 8 km long Bengre headland, primary breakwater of the city of Mangalore.

Boloor, primarily Sultan Battery, is linked to the rest of the city by bus no. 16 that makes trips to and from at intervals of 15–20 minutes.

Now, this monument is protected by central government of India and its all responsibility is on Archaeological survey of India Bangalore Circle.

References

History of Mangalore
Tourist attractions in Mangalore